Veten is a mountain in the city of Bergen, Norway. The name is an archaic word for "beacon" in Norwegian.

See also
List of mountains of Norway

References

Mountains of Bergen